1988–89 in Argentine football saw Independiente win the Argentine championship. In the international competitions there were two editions of the Copa Libertadores, the best performance came from Newell's Old Boys who were runners up in the Copa Libertadores 1988. Racing Club were the inaugural champions of the Supercopa Sudamericana, their first championship of any description since 1967.

League championship

The Argentine league championship featured an unusual points system. After each drawn match there was a penalty shootout to determine which team got the bonus point.
3 points: won match
2 points: draw, win on penalties
1 point: draw, loss on penalties
0 points: lost match

The tournament also featured an unofficial Apertura tournament to determine the two teams to qualify for the Copa Libertadores 1989. Racing Club and Boca Juniors were in the top two positions at the halfway stage of the season (after 19 games), and qualified.

Final table

Independiente qualify for Copa Libertadores 1990 as Argentine Champions.

Top Scorers

Relegation

Liguilla Pre-Libertadores

Winners tournament

Quarter finals

Semi finals

Winners Final

San Lorenzo qualified to play a final with the winner of the requalifying tournament.

Requalifying tournament

First round

Second round

Requalifying Final

Liguilla Final

River Plate qualified for Copa Libertadores 1990

Argentine clubs in international competitions

References

Argentina 1988-1989 by Pablo Ciullini  at rsssf.
Argentina 1980s by Osvaldo José Gorgazzi and Victor Hugo Kurhy at rsssf.
Copa Libertadores 1988 by Frank Ballesteros and Karel Stokkermans at rsssf.
Copa Libertadores 1989 by Frank Ballesteros and Karel Stokkermans at rsssf.
Supercopa 1988 by Fernando Semproni and Guillermo Rivera at rsssf
Recopa 1988 by Osvaldo Gorgazzi at rsssf